The Boston Protective Department was a salvage corps created by insurance companies in Boston, Massachusetts. The department was first organized in 1859 and granted a charter by the Massachusetts legislature in 1874. The department disbanded in 1959. Like many salvage corps, the employees were not employed by the city.

During the department's heyday, it had 3 stations, usually old firehouses. In 1911, the department had 61 employees, which consisted of a superintendent, three captains, six lieutenants, 33 permanent men and 18 auxiliaries.

Stations 
Protective #1 - 124-126 Broad Street - Downtown
Protective #2 - 4 Appleton Street - South End
Protective #3 - 161 Roxbury Street - Roxbury

References

History of firefighting
History of Boston
Insurance in the United States
Salvage corps